Missoula County Public Schools No. 1 (MCPS) is a public school district located in Missoula, Montana. It consists of one pre-school, one adult learning center, nine elementary schools, three middle schools, four high schools,  and one alternative high school. Only one school, Seeley-Swan High School, lies outside the city limits. The district motto is "Forward Thinking, High Achieving."

Schools

High schools
 Big Sky High School
 Hellgate High School
 Seeley-Swan High School
 Sentinel High School
 Willard Alternative High School Programs

Middle schools
 C.S. Porter School
 Meadow Hill Middle School
 Washington Middle School

Elementary schools
 Chief Charlo Elementary
 Cold Springs School
 Franklin Elementary School
 Hawthorne School
 Lewis and Clark Elementary
 Lowell School
 Paxson Elementary
 Rattlesnake School
 Russell School

Pre-schools
 Jefferson Center

Adult education programs
 The Lifelong Learning Center

References

External links
Official Website

School districts in Montana
Missoula, Montana